Peter French  (died 1693) was an Irish theologian.

A member of The Tribes of Galway, French joined the Dominican Order in the south of Spain. He spent thirty years as a missionary friar among the Indians in Mexico. His book, A Catechism or Exposition of the Christian Faith was written in the Mexican language but it is uncertain if it was ever printed.

He returned to Ireland on mission, and died in Galway in 1693.

See also

 Seán an tSalainn French
 Christopher French (theologian)
 Robert French (1716–1779)
 John Bodkin

References

 A Catechism or Exposition of the Christian Faith, n.d.
 History of Galway, James Hardiman, 1820
 Galway Authors, Helen Mahar, 1976

People from County Galway
17th-century Irish Roman Catholic theologians
Irish Dominicans
1693 deaths
Year of birth unknown